Srikail Gas Field is a natural gas field located in Comilla, Bangladesh. It is controlled by Bangladesh Petroleum Exploration and Production Company Limited (BAPEX).

Location
Srikail gas field is located in Srikail village of Shrikail union, Muradnagar Upazila, Comilla district, Chittagong Division.

Production 
BAPEX announced the discovery of the Srikail gas field in 2004, but the service could not continue due to faulty excavation; later in 2012, the well was excavated again. From May 5, to June 30, 2012, the gas was found at a depth of 3,218 meters.

It is a medium-sized gas field. According to BAPEX, the total gas reserves in this field is 300 billion cubic feet (BCF). Currently, the gas field is lifting 41-44 million cubic feet of gas per day by its two wells and providing them to the national grid.

See also 
List of natural gas fields in Bangladesh
Bangladesh Gas Fields Company Limited
Gas Transmission Company Limited

References 

2012 establishments in Bangladesh
Natural gas fields in Bangladesh